Jesse Adesotu Woghiren (born June 7), known professionally as THE BB02, is an American-Nigerian artist, songwriter, record label executive. He is the founder, CEO and head of Bigmanity music group and has produced songs like TNKOTB, Winter Vibes, Oyoyo, Feeling What I Feel and Zinga Zinga Ling.

Early life and education 
The BB02 was born into the royal family of Chief Egbe (Omedo) Woghiren of King Obanosa in Benin City and attributes his passion for music to the influence of his parent as his mother used to perform in the U.S. for family events and other gatherings while his grandfather, the First Obamedo of the Benin Kingdom, a descendant of King Obanosa was a renowned musician in his time.

BB02 attended Bunker Hill Community College and Northeastern University in Boston, USA where he studied Music & Business Management/Intellectual Properties Laws.

Music career 
The BB02 began classically singing at a young age due to the influence of his parent and grew up in the U.S.

He founded first an American based record label “BeyondTheSpheres Music” in 2011 and later coming back to Nigeria, he founded Bigmanity music in 2018, and his “Collectives” Imprint “The Lemlines” for scouting new talent.

In August 2022, he dropped a new song “Eye Dey Red” under Bigmanity Records, which addresses the troubled political trend around the globe.

Discography 
 "To the Top" 
 "Rich African love" 
 "Agolo" 
 "TNKOTB" 
 "Zinga Zinga Ling"
 "Vibes" (2019)
 "Halleluyah " (2020)
 "Dance like Say" (2021)
 "Kpor Kpor Kpor" (2021)
 "Eye dey Red" (2022)

See also 

 List of people from Benin city

References

External links 

 

Nigerian musicians
Living people
Nigerian singer-songwriters
Edo people
Year of birth missing (living people)